Pimelea chlorina is a species of flowering plant in the family Thymelaeaceae and is endemic to north Queensland. It is a shrub with silvery, elliptic or egg-shaped leaves and clusters of greenish-yellow, tube-shaped flowers.

Description
The leaves are covered with long, silky, silvery hairs. Flowering occurs in most months.

Taxonomy
Pimelea chlorina  was first formally described in 2017 by Anthony Bean in the journal Austrobaileya from specimens he collected in 2016. The specific epithet (chlorina) means pale green or greenish yellow, and refers to the colour of the flowers.

Distribution and habitat
This pimelea occurs in scattered populations between Mount Carbine and Charters Towers in north Queensland, where it usually grows on hillsides in soil derived from granite.

References

chlorina
Flora of Queensland
Malvales of Australia
Plants described in 2017
Taxa named by Anthony Bean